Zabol County is in Sistan and Baluchestan province, Iran. The capital of the county is the city of Zabol. At the 2006 census, the county's population was 317,357 in 67,778 households. The following census in 2011 counted 259,356 people in 63,645 households, by which time Hirmand District had been separated from the county to form Hirmand County. At the 2016 census, the county's population was 165,666 in 43,701 households, by which time Posht Ab District had been separated from the county to form Nimruz County, and Shib Ab District to become Hamun County.

Administrative divisions

The population history and structural changes of Zabol County's administrative divisions over three consecutive censuses are shown in the following table. The latest census shows one district, one rural district, and two cities.

References

 

Counties of Sistan and Baluchestan Province